Nitzani (Hebrew: ניצני) is a surname derived from the word Nitzan which means "bud". Notable people with the surname include:

Ya'akov Nitzani (1900-1962), Israeli politician
Yair Nitzani (born 1958), Israeli musician, songwriter, TV host and comedian

Hebrew-language surnames